Kamal Aljafari - also written Kamal Jafari (Arabic: كمال جعفري، كمال الجعفري ) is an acclaimed Palestinian  artist, film director and producer. 
 
His work has been shown worldwide at film festivals such as the Berlinale, Locarno, Viennale and Rotterdam. and museums such as the MoMA and Tate Modern. He attended the Academy of Media Arts in Cologne and now lives in Berlin, Germany.

In 2004 he received the Friedrich Vordemberge Stipendium of the city of Cologne, 2005 Stipendium der Stiftung Kunstfonds, 2005-2006  Imhoff-Stiftung Studio Stipendium at the Kölnischer Kunstverein. 

In 2009, he was a featured artist at the 2009 Robert Flaherty Film seminar in New York. 

Through 2009-2010 he was the Benjamin White Whitney fellow at Harvard University.

He taught filmmaking at The New School in New York. 2011–2013, Kamal Aljafari was a senior lecturer at the Deutsche Film- und Fernsehakademie Berlin. He was also a Film Study Center-Radcliffe Fellow at Harvard University.

In 2021 he was jury member for Leopard of tomorrow section of 74th Locarno Film Festival, 
and jury member for Burning Lights Competition of Visions du Réel, Nyon. https://kamalaljafari.art/

In 2021 Olhar de Cinema – Curitiba International Film Festival in Brazil devoted its Focus Section on the work of Kamal Aljafari.
https://www.olhardecinema.com.br/en/focus-kamal-aljafari/

His latest film Paradiso, XXXI, 108 was premiered in 2022 at the 75 Locarno Film Festival https://www.locarnofestival.ch/LFF/locarno75/program-75/film.html?fid=1292287&l=en&eid=75

A Fidai Film, was selected to Final Cut in Venice, working in progress competition, at Venice Film Festival 2022.

Filmography  
 2003 Visit Iraq (Director/Writer/Editor/Producer) short
 2006 The Roof  (Director/Writer/Editor/Producer)
 2007 Balconies  (Director/Writer/Producer) short
 2009 Port of Memory  (Director/Writer)
  2015 Recollection (Director/Writer/Editor/Cinematographer/Producer)
 2019 It’s a Long Way from Amphioxus  (Director/Writer/Editor/Producer) short
 2020 An Unusual Summer  (Director/Writer/Editor/Producer)
 2022 Paradiso, XXXI, 108 (Director/Writer/Producer) short
 2023 A Fidai Film  (Director/Writer/Editor/Producer)

Awards and honors
 Visual Arts Award from the Academy of Media Arts Cologne (2004, won) das Friedrich Vordemberge-Stipendium der Stadt Köln.
 Stipendium der Stiftung Kunstfonds 2004
 Imhoff-Stiftung Studio Stipendium, Kölnischer Kunstverein 2005–2006. 
 Best Soundtrack at the Marseille Festival of Documentary Film in France (2007, won - The Roof)
 Best International On Screen Award at the Images Festival in Toronto (2008, won - The Roof)
 Louis Marcorelles Prize at the Cinéma du Réel (2010, won - Port of Memory) 
 Jury member for International Documentary Program of 34th Torino Film Festival 2016  https://www.raccontardicinema.it/2016/11/29/34-torino-film-festival-i-premi/?lang=de
 Best film 10th Lanzarote Film Festival Spain 2020 (2020, won - "An Anusual Summer") http://muestradecinedelanzarote.com/en/previous-editions/10th-edition-2020/awards-and-jury/
 Jury prize 40th Filmmaker Festival Milan 2020 (2020, won - "An Anusual Summer") https://www.filmmakerfest.com/FilmFestival/2125
 Jury member for Burning Lights Competition of Visions du Réel, Nyon 2021 https://www.visionsdureel.ch/de/news/jury-2021/
 Jury member for Leopard of tomorrow section of 74th Locarno Film Festival in August 2021.

References 

 
 https://kamalaljafari.productions/

Living people
Palestinian film producers
Palestinian screenwriters
Palestinian film directors
People from Ramla
Year of birth missing (living people)